Lea Park is an unincorporated community in Alberta, Canada. It is located in east-central Alberta, between Lloydminster and Bonnyville.

The Jubilee Regional Park, administered by the village of Marwayne, is located north of the community, along with the Lea Park golf course.

The community gives the name to the Cretaceous age Lea Park Formation, which was described in an outcrop near Lea Park in 1918.

See also 
List of communities in Alberta

References 

Localities in the County of Vermilion River